Ding Xiangqun (born June 1965) is a Chinese economist and politician currently serving as head of the Organization Department of the CCP Anhui Provincial Committee. She previously served as vice chairwoman of Guangxi and before that, vice governor of the China Development Bank.

Ding is a representative of the 20th National Congress of the Chinese Communist Party and an alternate member of the 20th Central Committee of the Chinese Communist Party.

Biography
Ding was born in Huaiyin Special District (now Huai'an), Jiangsu, in June 1965. In 1983, she entered the Renmin University of China, where she majored in economic management.

After graduating in 1987, she was assigned to the Agricultural Bank of China. In August 1993, she was transferred to the Bank of China, where she stayed for almost 20 years. She joined the Chinese Communist Party (CCP) in May 1999. In January 2013, she became deputy general manager of China Taiping Insurance Group, but having held the position for only two and a half years. In July 2015, she was promoted to vice governor of the China Development Bank.

Ding began her political career in June 2017, when she was appointed vice chairwoman of Guangxi.

Ding was appointed head of the Organization Department of the CCP Anhui Provincial Committee in September 2018 and was admitted to member of the Standing Committee of the CCP Anhui Provincial Committee, the province's top authority.

References

1965 births
Living people
People from Huai'an
Renmin University of China alumni
Chinese economists
People's Republic of China politicians from Jiangsu
Chinese Communist Party politicians from Jiangsu
Alternate members of the 20th Central Committee of the Chinese Communist Party